Eva Adamová (born ) is a retired Czech volleyball player. She was part of the Czech Republic women's national volleyball team.

She participated in the 1994 FIVB Volleyball Women's World Championship. On club level she played with Alea Brno.

Clubs
 Alea Brno (1994)

References

1969 births
Living people
Czech women's volleyball players
Place of birth missing (living people)